Anthony "Tony" Skuse is a former Welsh professional darts player who competed in the 1980s.

Career
A winner of the 1981 British Gold Cup he beating John Corfe, Skuse reached the quarter finals of the 1982 British Professional was beating Tim Gould and Les Capewell before losing 5–0 to Eric Bristow, who eventually won the tournament. He then competed in the 1983 BDO World Darts Championship but was defeated by Paul Lim in the first round.

World Championship results

BDO
 1983: Last 32: (lost to Paul Lim 0–2)

External links
Profile and stats on Darts Database

Welsh darts players
Living people
British Darts Organisation players
1956 births